Chronological list of buildings designed by the American architecture firm, BarberMcMurry (formerly Barber & McMurry).  This list also includes early buildings designed by the firm's co-founder, Charles I. Barber.

Key
 Designed by Charles Barber (i.e., before the formation of Barber & McMurry, or outside the firm)
 Designed by Charles Barber and Dean Parmelee

NRHP – Listed on the National Register of Historic Places, with reference number given for individual listings, and historic district given for contributing properties
R – An existing building remodeled by the firm, with year of remodeling given in "Completed" column

Works

See also

List of George Franklin Barber works

References

Barber, Charles Irving